Nogale Manor is a manor house in Neo-Classicism style in Ārlava parish, in the Talsi municipality of the historical region of Courland, western Latvia. It was built around 1880 according to the project by the architect T. Seiler.

See also
List of palaces and manor houses in Latvia

References

External links
 

Manor houses in Latvia
Talsi Municipality